Farhan Khan (born 10 October 1990) is a Pakistani cricketer who plays for Lahore. He made his Twenty20 debut on 25 August 2016 for Lahore Blues in the 2016–17 National T20 Cup.

References

External links
 

1990 births
Living people
Pakistani cricketers
Lahore Blues cricketers
Lahore Eagles cricketers
Lahore Lions cricketers
State Bank of Pakistan cricketers
Cricketers from Lahore
Central Punjab cricketers